Minister of Safety and Security v Luiters, an important case in the South African law of delict, was heard in the Constitutional Court on August 17, 2006. Langa CJ, Moseneke DCJ, Madala J, Mokgoro J, Nkabinde J, O'Regan J, Sachs J, Van Der Westhuizen J, Yacoob J and Kondile AJ presided, handing down judgment on November 30. W. Trengove SC and RT Williams SC appeared for the applicant, and HP Viljoen SC and HM Raubenheimer SC for the respondent. The State Attorneys, Cape Town, represented the applicant; the respondent's attorneys were Smith & De Jongh, Bellville.

An application for leave to appeal against a decision of the Supreme Court of Appeal, the case revolved around the question of the vicarious liability of an employer for the delictual acts of an employee: in casu, the liability of the Minister of Safety and Security for criminal acts committed by police officers while off duty. An off-duty policeman had pursued persons who had attempted to rob him, and had in so doing shot an innocent third party. The Minister was held to be as liable for the delictual acts of an off-duty policeman who placed himself on duty as for those of an on-duty policeman. The Minister was therefore vicariously liable to the third party, one Allister Roy Luiters. Once an off-duty police officer puts himself on duty, the court held, that officer, for the purposes of vicarious liability, is in same legal position as the police officer ordinarily on duty.

Facts 
The applicant (the Minister) sought leave to appeal against a decision of the Supreme Court of Appeal in which it upheld a decision of the High Court to the effect that the State was liable in damages for the injuries sustained by the respondent when he was shot by a policeman in the employ of the South African Police Services (SAPS) who, although off duty, had placed himself on duty by embarking on a pursuit of suspects. He did so on the basis of his contention that the common-law rules governing vicarious liability ought to be developed so as to distinguish between off-duty policemen who placed themselves on duty and on-duty policemen.

Judgment 
Langa CJ, for a unanimous Constitutional Court, dismissed the application on the basis that there were no prospects of success on appeal. The court determined also that, once off-duty police officers are found, on the facts of a particular case, to have put themselves on duty, as they are empowered and required to do by their employer, they are for the purposes of vicarious liability in exactly the same legal position as police officers who are ordinarily on duty.

References

Case law 
 Alexkor Ltd and Another v the Richtersveld Community and Others 2004 (5) SA 460 (CC) (2003 (12) BCLR 1301).
 Bruce and Another v Fleecytex Johannesburg CC and Others 1998 (2) SA 1143 (CC) (1998 (4) BCLR 415).
 Carmichele v Minister of Safety and Security and Another (Centre for Applied Legal Studies Intervening) 2001 (4) SA 938 (CC) (2002 (1) SACR 79; 2001 (10) BCLR 995).
 Du Plessis and Others v De Klerk and Another 1996 (3) SA 850 (CC) (1996 (5) BCLR 658).
 Fedsure Life Assurance Ltd and Others v Greater Johannesburg Transitional Metropolitan Council and Others 1999 (1) SA 374 (CC) (1998 (12) BCLR 1458).
 K v Minister of Safety and Security 2005 (6) SA 419 (CC) (2005 (9) BCLR 835).
 Mabaso v Law Society, Northern Provinces and Another 2005 (2) SA 117 (CC) (2005 (2) BCLR 129).
 Minister of Police v Rabie 1986 (1) SA 117 (A).
 Minister of Safety and Security v Luiters 2006 (4) SA 160 (SCA).
 Minister of Safety and Security v Luiters 2007 (2) SA 106 (CC).
 Phumelela Gaming and Leisure Ltd v Gründlingh and Others 2006 (8) BCLR 883 (CC).
 S v Bequinot 1997 (2) SA 887 (CC) (1997 (1) SACR 369; 1996 (12) BCLR 1588).
 S v Bierman 2002 (5) SA 243 (CC) (2002 (2) SACR 219; 2002 (10) BCLR 1078).
 S v Boesak 2001 (1) SA 912 (CC) (2001 (1) SACR 1; 2001 (1) BCLR 36).

Notes 

Constitutional Court of South Africa cases
2006 in South African law
2006 in case law
South African delict case law